Peter Doherty is a British comic book artist and colourist.

Biography
Doherty's work over a 15-year career has mainly been concentrated on the classic 2000 AD character Judge Dredd.  He has illustrated several significant episodes of the strip. These include the story that has been acclaimed by fans as the best single episode story in the history of the strip, "Bury My Knee At Wounded Heart"; the classic origins story "Judge Death: Boyhood of a Superfiend"; and the swansong story of long-running support cast member Chief Judge McGruder, "Death of a Legend."

Outside 2000 AD, Doherty's work includes Grendel Tales and Shaolin Cowboy.

Doherty is currently working on Devlin Waugh.

Bibliography
Comics work (pencils and inks, unless specified) includes:

 "Felicity " (with Chris Standley, in Crisis #47, 1990)
 "Young Death" (with John Wagner, in Judge Dredd Megazine vol.1 #1–12, 1990–1991, collected in Young Death: Boyhood of a Superfiend, May 2008)
 Judge Dredd:
 "Justice One" (with Garth Ennis, in 2000 AD #766–771, 1992)
 "Judgement Day" (with Garth Ennis, in 2000 AD #786–799, 1992, collected in Judgement Day, Hamlyn, 1999, Rebellion, 2004)
 "Mechanismo Returns" (with John Wagner, in Judge Dredd Megazine vol.2 #22–26, 1993)
 "Roadkill" (with John Smith, in 2000 AD #856–858, 1993)
 "Bury My Knee at Wounded Heart" (with John Wagner, in Judge Dredd Megazine vol.2 #46, 1994)
 "Mr Bennet joins the Judges" (with Mark Millar, in 2000 AD Sci-Fi Special 1994)
 "Prologue" (with John Wagner, in Judge Dredd Megazine vol.2 #57, 1994)
 "Moving Violation" (with Chris Standley, in 2000 AD #856–858, 1994)
 "TV Babies" (with Chris Standley, in 2000 AD #898, 1994)
 "Death of a Legend" (with John Wagner, in 2000 AD #1009, 1996)
 "Spawney" (with John Wagner, in 2000 AD #1067–1068, 1996)
 "Simp City" (with John Wagner, in 2000 AD #1119–1120, 1998)
 "Dumskulls" (with Alan Grant, in 2000 AD #1171, 1998)
 "Slow Crime Day" (with John Wagner, in 2000 AD #1191, 2000)
 "The All New Adventures of P. J. Maybe" (with John Wagner, in 2000 AD #1204, 2000)
 "Blow Out!" (with John Wagner, in 2000 AD #1213, 2000)
 "Born Under a Bad Sign" (with Robbie Morrison, in 2000 AD #1275, 2002)
 "Dead Lost in Mega-City One" (with John Wagner, in Judge Dredd Megazine vol.4 #9, 2002)
 "Satan's Last Assault on Grud's Kingdom" (with Alan Grant, in 2000 AD #1288, 2002)
 "A Right Royal Occasion" (with Gordon Rennie, in 2000 AD #1293, 2002)
 "Versus" (with Simon Spurrier, in 2000AD #1499, 2006)
 "Night School" (with John Wagner, in Judge Dredd Megazine #260, 2007)
 "Mandroid: Instrument of War" (colours, with writer John Wagner and art by Carl Critchlow, in 2000 AD #1555–1566, 2007)
 "Ratfink" (with John Wagner, in Judge Dredd Megazine #273–277, 2008)
 "Old Wounds" (with John Smith, in Judge Dredd Megazine #287–288, August–September 2009)
 "Grudsent" (with Simon Spurrier, in Judge Dredd Megazine #299, July 2010)
Armitage: "City of the Dead Prologue" (with Dave Stone, in Judge Dredd Megazine #2.63, 1994)
Grendel Tales: The Devil May Care (with writer Terry LaBan, 6-issue limited series, Dark Horse Comics, 1995, tpb 160 pages, 2003)
The Dreaming #10–12, 17–19 (with Bryan Talbot and Caitlín R. Kiernan, Vertigo, 1997)
Batman & Superman: World's Finest #6–8 (pencils, with writer Karl Kesel and inks by Robert Campanella, DC Comics, 1997, tpb, 2003)
Seaguy (colours, with writer Grant Morrison, and art by Cameron Stewart, 3-issue mini-series, Vertigo, 2004, tpb, 2005))
Breathing Space (with Rob Williams, in 2000AD #1451–1452, 2005)
Shaolin Cowboy #1–7 (colours, with writer and artist Geof Darrow, Burlyman Entertainment, 2005–2007)
Devlin Waugh: "Innocence & Experience" (with John Smith, in Judge Dredd Megazine #253–256, 2007)

Awards
2005: Nominated for "Best Colorist" Eisner Award, for Shaolin Cowboy

Notes

References

Peter Doherty at Barney 
 "Here Comics The Ghouls" (interview with Michael Molcher, Judge Dredd Megazine #273, 2008)

External links
 
 2006 Interview with 2000ADReview

Year of birth missing (living people)
Place of birth missing (living people)
Living people
British comics artists